Parabolic constant can refer to:
 Universal parabolic constant, a mathematical constant
 Parabolic rate constant, a parameter of the Deal-Grove model